Hyde Park is a city in north-central Cache County, Utah, United States. The population was 3,833 at the 2010 census, with an estimated population of 4,700 in 2018. It is included in the Logan, Utah-Idaho Metropolitan Statistical Area.

History
The first settlers were Latter-day Saints who moved from Lehi in 1860. Hyde Park was officially organized by Ezra T. Benson  on July 1, 1860. The settlement was named in honor of William Hyde, one of the first settlers to arrive in the area on April 23, 1860. The name choice also evoked Hyde Park in London, England which was the homeland of many early settlers. It was at this same meeting that Hyde was also appointed as Bishop of the members of the Church of Jesus Christ of Latter-day Saints in Hyde Park. Hyde served as branch president from 1860–1872 and then as bishop from 1872–1874, when he died.

Hyde Park was surveyed in 1864 and homes on city lots began to replace the earlier fort-style dwellings. The first post office was established on June 15, 1864 and the first town elections were held on September 7, 1864. The first school and church meetings were held in a one-room log structure built in the summer of 1863. As the community grew, church meetings were moved to the new, larger Rock Meeting House constructed in 1866. Early settlers also had to deal with the problem of bringing water to the area for their crops. The first irrigation canal was built in the summer of 1860 and was known as the “Old Ditch.” A second canal known as the Logan-Richmond Canal was constructed in 1865 to help with the increasing demand for water.

In 1874, a census of Hyde Park showed a population of 445 individuals. Hyde Park was incorporated on January 16, 1892 with Charles G. Hyde as president of the board of trustees.

In 1930 the population of Hyde Park was 757.

Geography
Hyde Park is located at  (41.7988, -111.8191).  It lies in between the cities of North Logan and Smithfield, approximately five miles north of the county seat, Logan.

Demographics

As of the census of 2000, there were 2,955 people, 763 households, and 678 families residing in the city. The population density was 923.5 people per square mile (356.5/km2). The racial makeup of the city was 98.00% White, 0.14% African American, 0.07% Native American, 0.37% Asian, 0.10% Pacific Islander, 0.47% from other races, and 0.85% from two or more races. Hispanic or Latino of any race were 1.59% of the population.

There were 763 households, out of which 60.3% had children under the age of 18 living with them, 81.3% were married couples living together, 6.0% had a female householder with no husband present, and 11.1% were non-families. 9.8% of all households were made up of individuals, and 5.1% had someone living alone who was 65 years of age or older. The average household size was 3.87 and the average family size was 4.18.

In the city, the population was spread out, with 40.3% under the age of 18, 11.5% from 18 to 24, 25.1% from 25 to 44, 17.5% from 45 to 64, and 5.5% who were 65 years of age or older. The median age was 24 years. For every 100 females there were 101.7 males. For every 100 females age 18 and over, there were 95.2 males.

The median income for a household in the city was $51,750, and the median income for a family was $54,545. Males had a median income of $42,868 versus $25,000 for females. The per capita income for the city was $15,487. About 3.7% of families and 3.4% of the population were below the poverty line, including 3.0% of those under age 18 and 5.9% of those age 65 or over.

Notable persons
 John William Woolf, served in the Legislative Assembly of the Northwest Territories and Legislative Assembly of Alberta.

 Jonathan Marshall, Bigfoot researcher and Author of two books about Bigfoot in the Cache Valley area. 

Cache Valley Bigfoot: Field Guide and stories about Bigfoot in Cache Valley

Cache Valley Bigfoot: Sometimes the shadows do move in the woods

See also

 List of cities and towns in Utah

References

External links

 

Populated places established in 1860
Cities in Cache County, Utah
Cities in Utah
Logan metropolitan area
1860 establishments in Utah Territory